Huddersfield Town Association Football Club is a professional football club based in Huddersfield, West Yorkshire, England, which compete in the . The team have played home games at the Kirklees Stadium since moving from Leeds Road in 1994. The club colours of blue and white stripes were adopted in 1916. Their nickname, "The Terriers", was taken in 1969. Huddersfield's current emblem is based on the town's coat of arms. The team have long-standing West Yorkshire derby rivalries with Bradford City and Leeds United, as well as a Roses derby with Oldham Athletic.

Founded in 1908, Huddersfield competed in the North Eastern League and Midland League, before gaining admittance to the Football League in 1910. They were promoted out of the Second Division in 1919–20 and went on to win the FA Cup in 1922, having been beaten finalists in 1920. Under the management of Herbert Chapman, Huddersfield were crowned league champions in three successive seasons: 1923–24, 1924–25 and 1925–26. They played on the losing side in three more FA Cup finals: 1928, 1930 and 1938. They were relegated from the First Division after 32 years in 1952, though secured an immediate promotion the following season. Relegated again in 1956, they won the Second Division title at the end of the 1969–70 season, though were relegated three times in four years by 1975.

Huddersfield won the Fourth Division in 1979–80 and were promoted from the Third Division in 1982–83. Relegated in 1988, they were beaten in the 1994 final of the Football League Trophy, though returned to Wembley the following year to win the third tier's play-off final. They returned to the fourth tier in 2003 following a second relegation in three years. Huddersfield reached the Premier League with three successful play-off campaigns: from Division Three in 2004, from League One in 2012, and then from the Championship in 2017. They spent two seasons in the Premier League, before being relegated in 2019.

History

Early years and golden days (1908–1945) 
The club was founded in 1908. The founders bought a site on Leeds Road for £500, and joined the North Eastern League. The following season they joined the Midland Football League in order to reduce travelling costs. In an effort to gain entry into the Football League, the club invited Scottish architect Archibald Leitch to reconstruct Leeds Road. A 4,000-seat stand was to be constructed, and terracing was also planned, to provide an overall capacity of 34,000. After the plans went through, Huddersfield directors successfully applied to become members of the Football League in 1910, and development of Leeds Road began immediately. However, the development costs were too high, and attendances sunk below 7,000. Huddersfield went into liquidation in 1912, after which a new limited company was formed to take over the club’s assets.

Huddersfield Town were reportedly £25,000 in debt in 1919, and attendances fell to around 3,000. Chairman John Hilton Crowther planned to merge Town with newly formed Leeds United and to relocate to Leeds. The reports galvanised supporters to start fundraising to stave off the move. Shares of £1 had been released, converting the club to a public ownership. After a month of acquiring funds and negotiations, the club stayed in Huddersfield. The team then reached the 1920 FA Cup Final and won promotion to First Division for the first time.

During their first season in the top flight, former Leeds City manager Herbert Chapman was brought in (after Huddersfield helped him overturn his ban) as the new assistant to Ambrose Langley. Chapman replaced Langley in March 1921, and led the team to a 17th-place finish. In the summer of 1921, playmaker Clem Stephenson and the club's all-time top goal scorer George Brown were acquired. Chapman's tactics were based upon the principles of a strong defence and a fast, counter-attacking response, with the focus on quick, short passing and mazy runs from his wingers. He is regarded as the first manager to successfully employ the counter-attack. Other progressive ideas included a disciplined fitness regime for the players, and the practice of reserve and youth teams playing the same style as the senior team. He employed a wide-ranging scouting network to find the right players for his tactical system.

The team won their first ever major honour, the FA Cup, after Preston North End were beaten 1–0 in the 1922 FA Cup Final. Huddersfield also won the 1922 Charity Shield, defeating Liverpool 1–0. Town finished in third place in 1922–23, before winning their first ever First Division championship in 1923–24. The team fought off Cardiff City, although it was by the narrowest of margins. They both finished on 57 points, but Huddersfield won it by a difference of 0.024 in goal average. Huddersfield won 3–0 against Nottingham Forest in the last match, and Cardiff drew 0–0 at Birmingham City and missed a penalty.

The team retained their First Division title in 1924–25 after only one loss in the last 27 league matches. Huddersfield only conceded 28 goals and never conceded more than two per game; the first time a team accomplished this feat. Another notable feat was achieved in October 1924, as Billy Smith became the first player in history to score directly from a corner. After winning successive league titles, Chapman left for Arsenal, which offered to double his wages and attracted larger crowds than Huddersfield. Cecil Potter was brought in as his successor. Under Potter, Town became the first club to win three successive English League titles in 1925–26. The team came close to winning a fourth consecutive title the following season, but only won one of their last seven matches and thus handed the title to Newcastle United. Town won the "wrong double" in the 1927–28 season; they finished runners-up in both the league and lost the FA Cup Final.

In March 1928, an international match between England and Scotland featured five Town players. Tom Wilson, Bob Kelly, Billy Smith, and Roy Goodall started for England; Alex Jackson played for Scotland. Jackson scored a hat-trick as Scotland, later nicknamed "The Wembley Wizards", defeated England 5–1.

Huddersfield's ageing squad was not adequately replaced. A deterioration of their league position followed, although they finished runners-up in 1933–34, and two more FA Cup Finals were reached under new manager Clem Stephenson. Town were defeated in 1930 by Chapman's Arsenal, and in 1938 by Preston North End after extra time, which was the first FA Cup Final to be broadcast on television. A record home attendance of 67,037 was achieved in 1932 during an FA Cup sixth round tie against Arsenal.

Decline and recovery (1945–1992) 

Town were relegated for the first time in the 1951–52 season. Stockport County manager Andy Beattie was appointed in April 1952, and managed Stockport and Huddersfield in three divisions in the same month. He also had two horseshoes nailed to his office wall for luck. The team finished second in the Second Division in 1952–53 and made an immediate return. They finished in third place in their first season back in the top flight. After Town were relegated in 1955–56, Beattie resigned as manager in November 1956, and Bill Shankly succeeded him. In December 1957, the team led 5–1 with 30 minutes remaining against Charlton Athletic, but lost 7–6. Shankly left in December 1959 to manage Liverpool.

Floodlights were installed at Leeds Road in 1961, which were financed by the British record transfer fee of £55,000 of Denis Law to Manchester City, and became known as the "Denis Law Lights".

Huddersfield continued to play in the second tier during the 1960s. They reached the semi-final of the League Cup in 1967–68, but lost on aggregate to Arsenal. In 1969, the club adopted the nickname "The Terriers". Town won the Second Division in 1969–70 under the guidance of Ian Greaves. The team stayed up in their first season back in the first tier, but were relegated in 1971–72, which was followed by another relegation to the Third Division for the first time the season after. Huddersfield were relegated to the Fourth Division for the first time in 1974–75.

Former Town manager Tom Johnston returned to the club as general manager in 1975. The club later returned to all-blue shirts that he had introduced in the mid-1960s. Johnston replaced Bobby Collins as manager in December 1975. During the 1976–77 season, John Haselden became the manager with Johnston returning to his previous role. This, however, did not last, as Johnston demoted Haselden in September 1977 and gave himself the job. He managed Town to their lowest ever league position of 11th at the end of the 1977–78 season.

A recovery started under manager Mick Buxton, who was appointed in 1978. Huddersfield won the Fourth Division in 1979–80, scoring 101 goals in the process. Town finished just outside the promotion places the following season. The team won promotion to the Second Division in 1982–83 by a third-place finish. Due to Huddersfield languishing at the bottom of the division, declining home attendances, and the resulting financial pressure, Buxton was sacked in December 1986. The team stayed up by three points that season, but were relegated back to the third tier in 1987–88. Town only won six matches, conceded 100 goals, and lost 10–1 against Manchester City. Huddersfield reached the 1991–92 Third Division play-offs, but lost the semi-final against Peterborough United by an aggregate score of 4–3.

New stadium, on the brink of extinction, and a return to the top flight (1992–present) 

The team avoided relegation to the Third Division (renamed from the Fourth Division after the introduction of the Premier League) in 1992–93, following a run of only three defeats in their last 17 league games, to finish in 15th place. Manager Neil Warnock took over from Ian Ross for the 1993–94 season. Town reached the 1994 Football League Trophy Final, but lost against Swansea City on penalties.

Huddersfield Town played their final match at Leeds Road on 30 April 1994, beating Blackpool 2–1, which was watched by a near capacity crowd of 16,195. They moved into the new Kirklees Stadium (then named as the Alfred McAlpine Stadium) for the 1994–95 season. During the first season at the new stadium, Huddersfield were promoted to the second tier via the play-offs after a 2–1 win against Bristol Rovers at Wembley. Warnock left the club that summer, and was replaced by Brian Horton, who guided the Town to an eighth place finish the following season.

Horton was sacked in October 1997, with Huddersfield without a win in their first nine games. Former Huddersfield player Peter Jackson was given the job. They only scored one point in Jackson's first five games, but Huddersfield finally won in their 15th match, by beating Stoke City 3–1. Unbeaten runs mixed with winless runs followed, and Town managed to stay up by a 16th-place finish.

In January 1999, the club was bought by local businessman Barry Rubery, who targeted to reach the Premier League. Steve Bruce succeeded Jackson in May 1999. Huddersfield topped the table in December, but their form plummeted after striker Marcus Stewart was sold in the January transfer window to First Division rivals Ipswich Town. They finished the season in eighth place, just outside the play-offs. Bruce was sacked in October 2000. Rubery accused Bruce of "wasting £3m", arguing that the money would have been "spent more wisely by a more experienced manager without an ego to feed". He was replaced by Lou Macari, who was unable to halt the slide as relegation to the third tier followed at the end of the season. Huddersfield reached the play-offs in 2001–02, but lost 2–1 to Brentford in the semi-final.

Around this time, the club had debts of 20 million pounds following relegation and the collapse of ITV Digital. The players went months without being paid, and manager Mick Wadsworth was sacked in January 2003, only to be reinstated because the club did not have any money for his pay-off. Wadsworth was eventually sacked in March and replaced by Mel Machin, who oversaw relegation to the fourth tier. The club was put into administration, but Ken Davy bought the club in the summer of 2003 and rescued Town from liquidation. Manager Peter Jackson only had four senior players on the books before the beginning of the 2003–04 season, after which many youngsters from the academy setup were added. Huddersfield finished in a surprising fourth place, and defeated Mansfield Town in the play-off final to return to the third tier.

The team reached the play-offs in 2005–06, but were eliminated by Barnsley in the semi-final, after further seasons in League One followed. Dean Hoyle took over as chairman, and majority shareholder, of the club in June 2009. Town reached the play-offs in 2009–10 under manager Lee Clark, but lost against Millwall in the semi-final. The team again qualified for the play-offs the following season, however, Peterborough United were victorious in the final. Huddersfield set a Football League record of 43 matches unbeaten (not including the play-off matches), which was previously set by Nottingham Forest, in November 2011. Clark was sacked in February 2012 following a 1–0 home defeat to Sheffield United, and was replaced by former Leeds United manager Simon Grayson. He led Town to the play-off final against Sheffield United. The game finished 0–0 after extra time, before Huddersfield were victorious after 22 penalties (8–7).

Despite this success, Grayson was sacked in January 2013, being succeeded by Mark Robins. Huddersfield avoided relegation on the last day, after a draw with Barnsley. German Borussia Dortmund II coach David Wagner became the first person born outside the British Isles to manage the club in November 2015. He implemented the "Gegenpressing" style of play. In 2016–17, Town finished fifth with a negative goal difference, and qualified for the play-offs. After defeating Sheffield Wednesday on penalties in the semi-final, they faced Reading in the final. Another penalty shoot-out followed, and Huddersfield were again victorious. Promotion to the Premier League meant a return to the first tier for the first time since 1972. Huddersfield also became the second club, after Blackpool, to have won all three divisional play-offs.

The team finished 16th and stayed up on their return, but were relegated after a 20th-place finish in 2018–19. Wagner left the club by mutual consent in January 2019, and was replaced by Borussia Dortmund II manager Jan Siewert, but Town were relegated in March with six matches remaining. The team amassed only three wins and 16 points by the end of the season. Chairman Hoyle announced his departure in May 2019, selling the club to businessman Phil Hodgkinson, relinquishing the post due to poor health. Siewert was replaced by Lincoln City manager Danny Cowley in September of that year, who guided the club to survival in the Championship before being sacked. Leeds United assistant coach Carlos Corberán was appointed as the club's new head coach in July 2020.

Huddersfield finished third in the EFL Championship and met fourth placed Nottingham Forest in the 2022 EFL Championship play-off final at Wembley, losing 1–0 in controversial circumstances; Town were denied two penalty claims by referee Jonathan Moss in his last game before retirement. In the first instance, the video assistant referee failed to overturn Moss's decision despite apparent contact between Forest's Jack Colback and Huddersfield's Harry Toffolo.

Corberán left in July 2022, shortly before the start of 2022–23 Championship season. Within one month he joined Olympiacos in Greece. Former Town player Danny Schofield was appointed as the new head coach, but he was dismissed 10 weeks later after a poor start to the new season, to be replaced by Hertha BSC assistant coach Mark Fotheringham. He himself lasted only 4 months and was sacked on 8 February 2023.

Badge and colours
The club spent over eight years debating what colour the kit should be, with suggestions ranging from salmon pink to plain white or all-blue to white with blue yoke. Eventually, in 1916, the club adopted the striped blue and white jersey that remains to this day.

The club badge is based on the coat of arms of Huddersfield. Town first used a badge on its shirts for the 1920 FA Cup Final based on the Huddersfield coat of arms. It appeared again with a Yorkshire Rose for the 1922 FA Cup Final and again for the finals of 1928, 1930 and 1938. The club's main colours of blue and white are evident throughout the badge both in the mantling and in the shield, in the form of stripes. Two Yorkshire Roses and Castle Hill form part of the history of the club and the area.

Town stuck with the same principal design (blue and white stripes) until 1966, when Scottish manager Tom Johnston introduced all-blue shirts. A new badge was also adopted that year, when the vertical monogram "HTFC" adorned the all-blue shirts. When the club adopted the nickname "The Terriers" for the 1969–70 season, the blue and white stripes returned and with it a red terrier with the words "The Terriers".

After relegation to the Fourth Division, Huddersfield returned to all-blue shirts and the vertical monogram crest with the return of Tom Johnston in 1975. Stripes returned in the 1977–78 season and have been the club's home kit ever since. In 1980, Town adopted what remains their badge today. It combined elements of the old town coat of arms with modern motifs, such as blue and white stripes and a terrier with a football.

In 2000, Huddersfield changed its badge to a circular design, but that was never popular with the fans, and soon returned to the heraldic-style badge. The badge was further redeveloped with a small adaptation in 2005. The club took the decision to remove "A.F.C." from the text, leaving only the wording "Huddersfield Town". This eased problems with embroidery on shirts and club merchandise, and also gave the printwork a standard look.

The club adopted a Terriers logo in 2018. It was used solely on the strip and did not replace the heraldic crest, which continued to appear on all official media and documents. In 2019, Town agreed to have Paddy Power shirt sponsorship in a striking beauty queen style diagonal sash design. Within days, the club were contacted by The Football Association for their "observations" about the kit. Shortly after, it was revealed that the shirt was a prank envisioned by Paddy Power, and that the club would play in shirts without a sponsor. as part of their "Save Our Shirt" campaign.

Huddersfield returned to a updated version of their heraldic-style crest in 2019. The three stars (representing their hat-trick of league titles in the 1920s) were moved inside the shield. Furthermore, a single Yorkshire Rose was placed at the top of the blue and white stripes, above the three stars. The shield was also modernized by moving away from the more rounded version. The Terrier was incorporated into the crest, at the top of the shield, and the club's founding date was introduced on either side of Castle Hill.

Kit suppliers and shirt sponsors 

Source:

Stadium

Leeds Road (1908–1994)
Kirklees Stadium (1994–present)
Named "Alfred McAlpine Stadium" (1994–2004)
Named "Galpharm Stadium" (2004–2012)
Named "John Smith's Stadium" (2012–present)

Huddersfield were the first team to have played at each of the four professional levels of English football at two different grounds.

Supporters and rivalries 

Since 1920, Huddersfield's club song has been "Smile A While". The anthem was created by G. W. Chappell of Longwood, Huddersfield, before the 1920 FA Cup Final against Aston Villa. It was an adapted version of the popular First World War song "Till We Meet Again". Chappell's creation was originally called "The Town Anthem", and was sung by Town supporters ahead of the Final. The anthem is still sung by Huddersfield supporters at home matches.

In 2014, a group of Town fans formed a collective called "North Stand Loyal". Its aim was "to improve the atmosphere around the stadium on matchdays", and the members were "inspired by fan groups of continental Europe and other parts of the world". In 2017, the group renamed themselves "Cowshed Loyal". The group is located in the South Stand, which is shared with away fans.

The club also has various overseas supporters' groups, with clubs in Australia, Canada, Northern Ireland, Norway, Republic of Ireland, Singapore, Slovakia, and United States. Notable fans over the years have included Prime Minister Harold Wilson, who was born in the town, and actor Sir Patrick Stewart, who became president of the Huddersfield Town Academy in 2010.

Huddersfield Town's main rivals are considered to be West Yorkshire clubs Bradford City and Leeds United. Town hold the better head-to-head record against City; 21 matches have been won, 17 drawn, and 14 lost. Including games against United's predecessor team Leeds City, Huddersfield have won 36 of the 90 derbies between the two sides, with 20 draws and 34 Leeds wins.

There are smaller rivalries with South Yorkshire clubs Barnsley and Sheffield Wednesday, and there is a Roses rivalry with Oldham Athletic. Huddersfield also have a rivalry with Cambridgeshire club Peterborough United, largely fuelled by the play-off meetings in 1992 and 2011.

Players

First-team squad

Huddersfield Town B

Out on loan

Notable former players

Full internationals
Only players who have gained caps while at the club are included.

Australia
 Jason Davidson
 Aaron Mooy

Benin
 Steve Mounié

Bermuda
 Nahki Wells

Canada
 David Edgar

Curaçao
 Juninho Bacuna

DR Congo
 Elias Kachunga

Denmark
 Mathias Jørgensen

Egypt
 Ramadan Sobhi

England
 Pat Beasley
 George Brown
 Fred Bullock
 Austen Campbell
 Jack Cock
 Roy Goodall
 Harold Hassall
 Bob Kelly
 Bill McGarry
 Vic Metcalfe
 Michael O'Grady
 Billy Smith
 Ron Staniforth
 Clem Stephenson
 Ted Taylor
 Hugh Turner
 Sam Wadsworth
 Ken Willingham
 Ray Wilson
 Tom Wilson
 Alf Young

Jamaica
 Rolando Aarons
 Jermaine Beckford
 Theo Robinson

Japan
 Yuta Nakayama

Kosovo
 Florent Hadergjonaj

Luxembourg
 Danel Sinani

Montserrat
 Junior Mendes

Netherlands
 Terence Kongolo

Northern Ireland
/ Harry Baird
/ Laurie Cumming
/ Peter Doherty
/ Charlie Gallogly
/ Bill Hayes
/ James Macauley
/ Johnny McKenna
 Jimmy Nicholson
 Oliver Norwood
 Martin Paterson
 Brodie Spencer

Republic of Ireland
 Mick Fairclough
/ Bill Hayes
 Kevin Kilbane
 Mick Meagan
 Pat Saward

Scotland
 Paul Dixon
 Joe Harper
 Alex Jackson
 Denis Law
 Jordan Rhodes
 David Steele
 Jimmy Watson

Uganda
 Giosue Bellagambi

United States
 John Thorrington
 Danny Williams

Wales
 Marcus Browning
 Dai Evans
 Emyr Huws
 Steve Jenkins
 Joey Jones
 Dick Krzywicki
 Wilf Lewis
 Joel Lynch
 Charlie Morris
 Jazz Richards
 Iwan Roberts
 Sorba Thomas

English Football Hall of Fame members
Several ex-players/managers associated with Huddersfield Town are represented in the English Football Hall of Fame, which was created in 2002, as a celebration of those who have made an outstanding contribution to the game. To be considered for induction players/managers must be 30 years of age or older and have played/managed for at least five years in England.

  Herbert Chapman
  Peter Doherty
  Denis Law
  Bill Shankly
  Clem Stephenson
  Ray Wilson

Football League 100 Legends
The Football League 100 Legends is a list of "100 legendary football players" produced by the Football League in 1998, to celebrate the 100th season of league football. Three former Huddersfield players made the list.

  Clem Stephenson
  Peter Doherty
  Denis Law

Player of the Year (Hargreaves Memorial Trophy)
As voted for by members of the official Huddersfield Town Supporters Club.

Club management

Club officials

Source:

First team technical staff

Source:

Managerial history

Honours and achievements
In 1926, Huddersfield Town became the first English team to win the First Division title in three consecutive seasons, a feat not surpassed to this day, although it has been equalled by Arsenal, Liverpool, and on two occasions by Manchester United.

Huddersfield Town were the second team, after Blackpool, to have won all three divisional play-offs. The club's honours include the following:

League
First Division (first tier)
 Champions: 1923–24, 1924–25, 1925–26
 Runners-up: 1926–27, 1927–28, 1933–34

Second Division / Championship (second tier)
 Champions: 1969–70
 2nd place promotion: 1919–20, 1952–53
 Play-off winners: 2017

Third Division / Division Two / League One (third tier)
 3rd place promotion: 1982–83
 Play-off winners: 1995, 2012

Fourth Division / Division Three (fourth tier)
 Champions: 1979–80
 Play-off winners: 2004

Cup
FA Cup
 Winners: 1921–22
 Runners-up: 1919–20, 1927–28, 1929–30, 1937–38

FA Charity Shield
 Winners: 1922Football League Trophy'''
 Runners-up: 1993–94

Notes

Sources

References

Bibliography

External links

 
 Supporters Trust
 HTAFC Patrons
 Huddersfield Town blog

 
1908 establishments in England
Association football clubs established in 1908
Sports clubs in Huddersfield
Football clubs in West Yorkshire
Football clubs in England
North Eastern League
Midland Football League (1889)
English Football League clubs
Premier League clubs
FA Cup winners